Soumitra Dutta is an Indian academic, author and entrepreneur. He is the dean of Saïd Business School at the University of Oxford, having taken up the post from 1 June 2022. He was previously a professor of management, as well as the former Founding Dean, at the SC Johnson College of Business at Cornell University in New York. He was dean of SC Johnson College of Business from 2012 to 2018. Before his appointment to Cornell, he was the Roland Berger professor of business and technology at INSEAD. 

Dutta is married to fellow academic, Lourdes Casanova

Biography
He undertook his first degree at the Indian Institute of Technology in New Delhi, graduating with a B.Tech. in Electrical Engineering & Computer Science in 1985. In 2017, he received a Distinguished Alumnus Award from IIT.

He continued his education at Berkeley University of California, gaining an M.S in computer science in 1987, an M.S in Business Administration in 1989 and a Ph.D in computer science in 1990. 

He joined INSEAD faculty, as an Assistant Professor of Information Systems, Technology Management Area in 1989, later serving as the Dean of Technology and E-learning, Dean of Executive Education, and the Dean of External Relations.

In 2008, he founded Fisheye Analytics, which provided analytics for social media. In 2013, it was acquired by the WPP group. 

In 2012, he joined Cornell University as Dean of the Samuel Curtis Johnson Graduate School of Management and later became the founding dean of its business school - SC Johnson College of Business - in 2016. Dutta played a key role in the establishment of Cornell Tech campus in New York and the launch of a unique one year MBA program focused on the digital economy. He led the global growth of the school, including the setting up of the Cornell-Tsinghua dual degree MBA program across Beijing and New York, which remains the only American Ivy League MBA degree offered in mainland China. During his time as dean, Dutta was tasked with leading the integration of Cornell’s three business schools: SC Johnson, the Charles H. Dyson School of Applied Economics and Management, and the Peter and Stephanie Nolan School of Hotel Administration, into one unified college; The Cornell College of Business, which was established in March, 2016. It was renamed the Cornell SC Johnson College of Business in January 2017. Dutta enlarged the faculty size by 50%. He collaborated with the President and Provost of Cornell University to raise a $150m naming gift for the college from Fisk Johnson and the SC Johnson company. To date, it remains the second-largest gift to a business school in history. Dutta served as dean until 2018.

So far in his career, Dutta has taught in Oxford, Berkley, Cambridge, Brussels, Athens, INSEAD and Cornell.

In 2014, he was part of President Obama's White House roundtable with business school deans on effective workforce policies.

Dutta has been a member of the board of Sodexo between 2014 and 2020. He is also a board member of Dassault Systemes, which he has been on since 2017.

In 2018, he was appointed as a Member of the Shareholder Council, at ZS Consulting. 

He has been Vice Chair and Chair of AACSB Intl between 2016 and 2018. AACSB is the largest accreditation body for business schools globally.

He has been the Chair of the Board of the Global Business School Network since 2018.

Dutta is the president and Co-Founder, Portulans Institute which was set up in 2019, as an independent non-profit research institute based in Washington DC.

He is a member of the Davos Circle, serving as the Co-Chair of the Global Future Council on Innovation Ecosystems for the World Economic Forum. 

He is deeply involved with non-profits and is on the boards of several global business schools including Centrum Catholica (Peru), HEC Montreal, University of Los Andes (Colombia), ESADE (Spain) and others.

In 2022, it was announced Dutta will become the new Dean of  Saïd Business School at Oxford University. He will take up his position on 1 June 2022, replacing interim dean Sue Dobson. His research interests include, AI and the future of work; social media and big data analytics; technology and innovation policies.

Publications 
Soumitra Dutta is the founder and co-editor of fourteen editions of the Global Innovation Index which is published with the World Intellectual Property Organization and is leading global assessment of national innovation capabilities.

He has co-edited sixteen annual reports of the Global Information Technology Report for the World Economic Forum on the impact of information technology on development and national competitiveness. The Global Information Technology Report has been rebranded and published as the Network Readiness Index since 2019 by Portulans Institute.

Dutta has been the founding co-editor of the annual Global Information Technology Report published by the World Economic Forum, and the founder of the annual Global Innovation Index published by the World Intellectual Property Organization.  

His other books include:

 Throwing Sheep in the Boardroom: How Online Social Networking Will Transform Your Life, Work and World, with Matthew Fraser. Wiley 2008.
 Innovating at the Top: How Global CEOs Drive Innovation for Growth and Profit, with Roland Berger, Geoffrey Samuels and Tobias Raffel. Palgrave MacMillan 2009.
 
 Entrepreneurship and the Finance of Innovation in Emerging Markets, with Lourdes Casanova and Peter Cornelius. Elsevier 2018.
 </ref>

Selected Awards
Dutta received the European Case of the Year from the European Case Clearing House in 2002, 2000, 1998, and 1997.

“Light of India Award”, for Excellence in Education and Academics, New York, June 1, 2012 (Awarded by the Times of India Group).

Distinguished Alumnus Award (2017) IIT Delhi.

Fellow (2017) World Economic Forum.

Member of Dubai Future Council on Entrepreneurship and Innovation, 2019 and 2020.

References
 

University of California, Berkeley alumni
Living people
Academic staff of INSEAD
Cornell University faculty
Business school deans
Women deans (academic)
Scholars from Chandigarh
Indian academic administrators
Year of birth missing (living people)